The Garcias is an American sitcom developed by Jeff Valdez that premiered on the streaming service HBO Max on April 14, 2022. The series is a sequel to The Brothers García. In December 2022, the series was canceled after one season.

Cast and characters

Main
 Ada Maris as Sonia García
 Carlos Lacámara as Ray García
 Alvin Alvarez as Larry García
 Bobby Gonzalez as George García
 Nitzia Chama as Ana García
 Maeve Garay as Victoria García
 Vaneza Pitynski as Lorena García-Ramirez
 Paul Rodriguez Jr. as Julian Ramirez
 Oliver Alexander as Max García-Ramirez
 Jeffrey Licon as Carlos García
 Elsha Kim as Yunjin Huh García
 Trinity Jo-Li Bliss as Alexa Huh García
 Ayva Severy as Andrea Huh García

Special guest stars
 Jeremy Ray Valdez as Conner Rascon
 Carmen Carrera as Kim
 Emilio Rivera as Shaman
 Adrian Gonzalez as Pablo
 Jaime Aymerich as Pato
 Omar Leyva as Sol

Episodes

Production

Development
On April 30, 2021, HBO Max gave production a series order consists of ten episodes titled as The Garcias, a sequel to The Brothers García. The sequel is developed by Jeff Valdez who is also executive producing it alongside Sol Trujilo. New Cadence Productions is the company involved with producing the series. The series was released on April 14, 2022. In December 2022, the series was canceled, with the rights reverting back to the production studio.

Casting
Upon the series order announcement, it was reported that Carlos Lacámara, Ada Maris, Jeffrey Licon, Bobby Gonzalez, Vaneza Pitynski, and Alvin Alvarez are set to reprise their roles. On July 8, 2021, Oliver Alexander, Nitzia Chama, Maeve Garay, Elsha Kim, Ayva Severy, and Trinity Jo-Li Bliss joined the main cast.

Filming
Principal photography for the series was scheduled to begin in June 2021 in Puerto Aventuras, Mexico. On July 8, 2021, it was reported that the series is filming in Riviera Maya, Mexico, in and around the town of Puerto Aventuras.

Reception

The review aggregator website Rotten Tomatoes reported a 33% approval rating with an average rating of 4.5/10, based on 6 critic reviews.

References

External links
 

2022 American television series debuts
2022 American television series endings
2020s American sitcoms
American sequel television series
English-language television shows
HBO Max original programming
Television series about brothers
Television series about children
Television series about families
Latino sitcoms
Television shows filmed in Mexico